Deshpremee Jana Samukshya was a joint front of leftist parties in the Indian state of Orissa. DJS existed in September 2004. It consisted of Communist Party of India (Marxist-Leninist) New Democracy, Communist Party of India (Marxist-Leninist), Communist Party of India (Marxist-Leninist) Red Flag, and Lokapakhya.

Defunct political parties in Odisha
Year of establishment missing